Chester Coe Swobe (May 23, 1929 – May 26, 2016) was an American politician who was a Republican member of the Nevada General Assembly and Nevada State Senate. An alumnus of the University of Nevada and University of Denver College of Law, he was an attorney.

Swobe died of liver failure at the age of 87.

References

External links

1929 births
2016 deaths
Republican Party members of the Nevada Assembly
Republican Party Nevada state senators
Politicians from Reno, Nevada
University of Nevada alumni
University of Denver alumni
Nevada lawyers
20th-century American politicians
20th-century American lawyers
21st-century American lawyers